Semé Pierre Pattrick (born February 2, 1981) is a Cameroonian footballer who currently plays as a defender for Perseru Serui

Honours

Club
Dynamo Douala
Cameroonian Cup (1): 1998

Cotonsport Garoua
Championnat du Cameroun de football (2): 2005, 2006

International
Cameroon
CEMAC Cup (1): 2005

References

External links 
 Profile at Liga Indonesia Official Site

Cameroonian footballers
Living people
Cameroonian Muslims
Expatriate footballers in Indonesia
1981 births
Persikabo Bogor players
Persema Malang players
Converts to Islam
Liga 1 (Indonesia) players
Arema F.C. players
Persiram Raja Ampat players
Association football defenders